Anthony Hayes (born 21 September 
1977) is an Australian actor, best known for his roles in War Machine, The Light Between Oceans, The Slap, Look Both Ways, The Boys, Rabbit-Proof Fence, Animal Kingdom and soap opera Paradise Beach.

Career
Apart from acting in numerous films and television shows, he also wrote, directed and produced the films Ten Empty (2008), New Skin (2002) and Sweet Dreams (2002).  Ten Empty had its World Premiere at the Sydney Film Festival (2008). The screenplay was nominated for 2007 Queensland Premier's Literary Awards and 2008 Victorian Premier's Literary Award. New Skin (2002) won the Dendy Award at the 2002 Sydney Film Festival and won Hayes an IF Award as best emerging director. Sweet Dreams (2002) was voted most popular film by the audience at the St Kilda Film Festival in 2003. Hayes also earned AFI and Film Critics Circle award nominations for The Boys.

Hayes received AFI and Film Critics Circle award nominations for best supporting actor in The Square (2009), and won for Look Both Ways (2005) and Suburban Mayhem (2006).

He is a co-founder of Rogue Stars Productions with fellow actors Brendan Cowell and Leland Kean in 1999.

Although primarily a screen actor, Hayes does voice over work as well.

Joel Edgerton nicknamed him "The King of Western Grit" during the shooting of The Square, The moniker later became the name of a Facebook page, with a collection of movie posters with Hayes' face on them.

Anthony co-wrote the film Gold with writer Polly Smyth. It stars Zac Efron, Susie Porter and himself. He directed and produced it through his company Rogue Star Pictures. The film was shot in South Australia in 2020.

Activism
In April 2015, Hayes, with his partner Writer Polly Smyth, organised the #saveourboys video featuring celebrities including: Bryan Brown, Guy Pearce, Geoffrey Rush, Joel Edgerton, Luke Hemsworth, Brendan Cowell and Peter Helliar. The video called upon Australian Prime Minister Tony Abbott to step up and secure the lives of reformed drug smugglers Andrew Chan and Myuran Sukumaran in the last 24 hours before their execution. In the video, Hayes himself said: "show some ticker Tony Abbott. Get to Indonesia. It's your job." The video went viral and amassed much support on social media.  Despite many stating the government had done all it can leading up to their deaths, it was later claimed by human rights lawyer Geoffrey Robertson QC that a number of avenues could have been taken.

Filmography

Feature films

Short films

TV

Director, writer and producer

Awards and nominations

See also
Cinema of Australia

References

External links

Official website - Anthony Hayes
EM Voices - Anthony Hayes

1977 births
Australian film producers
Australian male child actors
Australian male film actors
Australian male television actors
Australian male voice actors
Australian screenwriters
Best Supporting Actor AACTA Award winners
Living people
Logie Award winners
Male actors from Brisbane
20th-century Australian male actors
21st-century Australian male actors